Gao Yunlong (born ) is a Chinese politician, who is currently a vice chairperson of the Chinese People's Political Consultative Conference.

Reference

External links 

1958 births
Living people